Collette Divitto (born 1990) is an entrepreneur and disability rights activist based in Boston, Massachusetts. She is the founder of Collettey's Cookies.

Early life
Divitto has Down syndrome. She graduated from Clemson University in South Carolina in 2013.

Career
Collettey's Cookies was founded in 2015, with help from her mother Rosemary Alfredo and sister Blake, after failing to find paid employment. Her first retail account was Golden Goose Market, a store in her neighborhood, the North End. The store was selling 100 bags of Collettey's Cookies within the first week. After a TV news segment about the company in the winter of 2016, which was amplified via social media, sales increased. In 2018, represented  the Massachusetts Down Syndrome Congress at the United Nations as a star ambassador.

See also 

 List of people with Down syndrome
 Supported employment
 National Disability Employment Awareness Month
 Self-employment
 Employment discrimination

References

External sources
 Collette Divitto's Facebook profile
 Facebook page for Collettey's Cookies
 Website for Collettey's Cookies
 Twitter account for Collettey's Cookies (featuring photographs of cookies, labels, Collette, and staffers) - @colletteycookie

Living people
Clemson University alumni
American businesspeople
People with Down syndrome
American people with disabilities
Disability articles needing attention
1990 births